Crematogaster yamanei species of ant in the subfamily Myrmicinae.

References

Insects described in 2009
yamanei